Elephantimorpha is a group that contains the elephants as well as their extinct relatives, the gomphotheres and stegodontids. The following cladogram shows the relationships among elephantimorphs, based on hyoid characteristics:

References